Katalin Sterk (born 30 September 1961 in Tatabánya) is a retired Hungarian high jumper. Her personal best jump was 1.98 metres, achieved in August 1986 in Budapest. She became Hungarian champion in 1980, 1982, 1986 and 1988.

Achievements

References

1961 births
Living people
Hungarian female high jumpers
Sportspeople from Komárom-Esztergom County